Courtenay Meredith (born 23 September 1926) was a Welsh international rugby union prop who played club rugby for Neath. He won fourteen caps for Wales and also played for invitational club the Barbarians. Meredith was a powerful prop, and was much praised by second row players for his tight packing, which allowed them the opportunity to shove the opposition. He played both tight and loose head prop but preferred tight head.

On the 1955 British and Irish Lions Tour the all-Welsh front row of Billy Williams, Bryn Meredith and Courtenay Meredith was selected for a Lions test match. This did not occur again until June 2009 when Gethin Jenkins, Adam Jones and Matthew Rees were selected as the British and Irish Lions front row for the 2nd Test against South Africa.

Meredith celebrated his 95th birthday in 2021. He is the only survivor from Wales’ last triumph over New Zealand, the 13–8 victory at Cardiff Arms Park on 19 December 1953.

International matches played
Wales
  1954, 1955, 1956, 1957
  1954, 1955
  1954, 1955, 1956
  1953
  1953,1954, 1955, 1957

Bibliography

References 

1926 births
Living people
Rugby union players from Pontypridd
People educated at Neath Grammar School for Boys
Alumni of Cardiff University
Welsh rugby union players
Wales international rugby union players
Rugby union props
British & Irish Lions rugby union players from Wales
Barbarian F.C. players
Neath RFC players